Qiwllaqucha (Quechua qillwa, qiwlla, qiwiña gull, qucha lake, "gull lake", Hispanicized spelling Jeullacocha) is a lake in the Huancavelica Region in Peru. It is located in the Huancavelica Province, Huancavelica District, south of Huancavelica.

References 

Lakes of Peru
Lakes of Huancavelica Region